A-372159 is a drug which acts as a potent and selective partial agonist for the 5HT2C receptor, with more than 100x selectivity over the closely related 5-HT2B receptor and a Ki of 3nM. It has been found to produce anorectic effects in animal studies and produced significant weight loss in rats with no development of tolerance or serious side effects.

References

Serotonin receptor agonists
4-Hydroxybiphenyl ethers
Trifluoromethyl compounds
Piperidines
Cyclic ethers
Isopropyl compounds